Zhenping County is a county in the southwest of Henan province, China. It is under the administration of the prefecture-level city of Nanyang.

Introduction
Zhenping was known in ancient times as Nieyang. It has a long history of jade carving for more than 4,000 years, and it is known as the jade capital of China. It is one of the birthplaces of Chinese jade culture. Jin Laizong Zhengda was set up in Zhenping County for three years (1226 AD). Yuan Haowen, a famous poet in the Jinyuan period, was the first county magistrate in Zhenping. Zhenping was also the hometown of the modern general Peng Xuefeng.

Administrative divisions
As 2012, this county is divided to 3 subdistricts, 11 towns, 7 townships and 1 ethnic township.
Subdistricts
Nieyang Subdistrict
Xuefeng Subdistrict
Yudu Subdistrict

Towns

Townships

Ethnic townships
Guozhuang Hui Township

Climate

Economy
The Henan Kangyuan Softshell Turtle Farm, located in Zhenping County's Jiasong Town is one of China's largest facilities for raising the Yellow River Turtle, a variety of the Chinese softshell turtle. The farm, which occupies 600 mu (100 acres) of land and water, raises some 6 million of those creatures per year.

Notes

 
County-level divisions of Henan
Nanyang, Henan